Chalazoscolex is a genus of palaeoscolecidian worm known from the Sirius Passet.  It had around 140 segments, each adorned with two rows of palaeoscolecid plates.  Its body was organised into three transverse sections, the medial bearing three large sclerites acrosswise, the laterals bearing ridges.

References

Cambrian invertebrates
Prehistoric protostome genera
Fossil taxa described in 2010
Paleoscolecids